Carvel is a hamlet in Alberta, Canada within Parkland County. The hamlet's name is derived from the novel Richard Carvel by the American writer Winston Churchill.

Carvel's largest building is the St. Nicholas Ukrainian Catholic Church and adjoining community hall.

In August 2008, a memorial to the founding pioneer families of Carvel was placed at the entrance to the church's graveyard.

Demographics 
The population of Carvel according to the 2009 municipal census conducted by Parkland County is 19.

See also 
List of communities in Alberta
List of hamlets in Alberta

References 

Hamlets in Alberta
Parkland County